Confederate Park may refer to:

Confederate Park, in Demopolis, Alabama, now known as Demopolis Town Square, listed on the National Register of Historic Places in Marengo County, Alabama
Confederate Park (Greenville, Alabama), listed on the National Register of Historic Places in Butler County, Alabama
 Confederate Park (Jacksonville, Florida), a public park in Jacksonville, Florida
 Confederate Park (Memphis, Tennessee), a public park in Memphis, Tennessee renamed Memphis Park in 2013

See also
Confederate Monument